This is a list of awards and nominations given to the animated television series Family Guy (FOX, 1999–present).

Annie Awards

Artios Awards

ASCAP Film and Television Music Awards

BAFTA TV Awards

Behind the Voice Actors Awards

Cinema Audio Society Awards

Critics' Choice Television Award

Genesis Awards

Golden Trailer Awards

Grammy Awards

Hollywood Critics Association TV Awards

Primetime Emmy Awards

Saturn Awards

Writers Guild of America Awards

See also

References

Family Guy
Family Guy